The 2008–09 Maltese FA Trophy was the 71st season since its establishment. It features 20 teams from Maltese Premier League and First Division. The competition started on 25 October 2008 and ended on 30 May 2009 with the Final.

Birkirkara were the defending champions, but were eliminated in the semi-finals by Valletta.

Results
When the draw was conducted four teams received a bye to the Quarterfinals. Birkirkara received a bye because they won the 2007–08 Maltese FA Trophy. Other three teams qualifying directly to the Quarterfinals are Valletta, Marsaxlokk and Sliema Wanderers, for being (except Birkirkara) three best-placed teams in last year's Premier League.

First round
In the First Round entered Premier League teams placed 4th to 10th and 10 First Division teams. The matches were played on 25, 26 October, 1 and 2 November  2008.

|colspan="3" style="background:#fcc;"|25 October 2008

|-
|colspan="3" style="background:#fcc;"|26 October 2008

|-
|colspan="3" style="background:#fcc;"|1 November 2008

|-
|colspan="3" style="background:#fcc;"|2 November 2008

|}

Second round
In this round entered winners from the previous round. The matches were played on 8 and 9 November 2008.

|colspan="3" style="background:#fcc;"|8 November 2008

|-
|colspan="3" style="background:#fcc;"|9 November 2008

|}

Quarter-finals
In this round entered winners from the previous round and four teams that had received a bye. The matches were played on 7 February 2009. All 8 teams from this round were from the Premier League. Marsaxlokk, Birkirkara, Valletta and Sliema won their ties and advanced to the semifinals.

Semi-finals
The matches were played on 7 and 8 March 2009. Holders Birkirkara met the same team they met the previous year, Valletta. But this time they lost and it was Valletta who reached the final. In the other semifinal Sliema beat Marsaxlokk 4–3 on penalties after the match finished in a 1–1 draw.

Final
The final was played on 29 May 2009.

External links
 Official site

2008–09 domestic association football cups
Cup
2008–09